Dotara Dam is a proposed carryover dam located in Dotara village, Abbottabad District, Khyber Pakhtunkhwa, Pakistan. It will supply water to Rawalpindi and Islamabad, serve as a facility for fisheries, and reduce silting in the downstream Khanpur Dam, extending its lifespan to over 100 years.

References

Dams in Pakistan
Hydroelectric power stations in Pakistan
Abbottabad District
Dams in Khyber Pakhtunkhwa